Hamecamyia is a genus of flies belonging to the family Chamaemyiidae.

Species:
 Hamecamyia stuckenbergi Gaimari, 2012

References

Chamaemyiidae
Brachycera genera